Konar Baland (also Romanized as Konār Baland) is a village in Dezhgan Rural District, in the Central District of Bandar Lengeh County, Hormozgan Province, Iran. At the 2006 census, its population was 20, in 4 families.

References 

Populated places in Bandar Lengeh County